Joseph Gregory Sparks (born March 31, 1964) is an American professional baseball coach and a former minor league player and manager. In 2016, Sparks was named assistant hitting coach for the Chicago White Sox of Major League Baseball, a position he held through 2019.

Career
Born in Chandler, Arizona, he is the son of Joe Sparks, a retired professional baseball player, coach, manager and scout. Greg Sparks served as a batboy for the White Sox in 1979 (when his father spent part of that year on the club's coaching staff), and was present on Disco Demolition Night. He went on to attend Mesa Community College, then forge a 13-year playing career, mostly at the Double-A level. In 1992, he hit 25 home runs as a member of the London Tigers of the Eastern League.

He worked for the Oakland Athletics' organization for 19 years, beginning in 1997, as a minor league manager and hitting coordinator. The White Sox hired him as their assistant hitting coach after the 2015 season.

References

External links

1964 births
Living people
Albany-Colonie Yankees players
American expatriate baseball players in Canada
American expatriate baseball players in Mexico
Baseball first basemen
Baseball coaches from Arizona
Baseball players from Arizona
Buffalo Bisons (minor league) players
Canton-Akron Indians players
Carolina Mudcats players
Charleston Rainbows players
Chicago White Sox coaches
Greenville Braves players
Huntsville Stars players
London Tigers players
Lubbock Crickets players
Madison Muskies players
Major League Baseball hitting coaches
Mesa Thunderbirds baseball players
Minor league baseball managers
New Haven Ravens players
Pawtucket Red Sox players
Sportspeople from Chandler, Arizona
Reno Padres players
Salinas Spurs players
Spokane Indians players
Tigres del México players
Toledo Mud Hens players